The 2014–15 American Eagles women's basketball team represented American University during the 2014–15 NCAA Division I women's basketball season. The Eagles, led by second year head coach Megan Gebbia, played their home games at Bender Arena and were members of the Patriot League. They finished the season 24–9, 16–2 in Patriot League play to win the Patriot League Regular Season Championship. They also won the Patriot League women's tournament to earn an automatic trip to the NCAA women's tournament for the first time in school history, where they lost to Iowa in the first round.

Roster

Schedule

|-
!colspan=9 style="background:#0000FF; color:#CC0000;"| Non-conference regular season

|-
!colspan=9 style="background:#0000FF; color:#CC0000;"| Patriot League regular season

|-
!colspan=9 style="background:#0000FF; color:#CC0000;"| Patriot League Women's Tournament

|-
!colspan=9 style="background:#0000FF; color:#CC0000;"| NCAA Women's Tournament

See also
 2014–15 American Eagles men's basketball team

References

American
American Eagles women's basketball seasons
American
American Eagles women's basketball
American Eagles women's basketball